Termination may refer to:

Science 

Termination (geomorphology), the period of time of relatively rapid change from cold, glacial conditions to warm interglacial condition
Termination factor, in genetics, part of the process of transcribing RNA
Termination type, in lithic reduction, a characteristic indicating the manner in which the distal end of a lithic flake detaches from a core
Chain termination, in chemistry, a chemical reaction which halts polymerization
Termination shock, in solar studies, a feature of the heliosphere
Terminating computation, in computer science
Termination analysis, a form of program analysis in computer science
Termination proof, a mathematical proof concerning the termination of a program
Termination (term rewriting), in particular for term rewriting systems

Technology
Electrical termination, ending a wire or cable properly to prevent interference
Termination of wires to a
Crimp connection
Electrical connector
Solder joint
Abort (computing), ending a processing activity

Other
Termination (album), by Japanese band 9mm Parabellum Bullet
Indian termination policy, U.S. government policy affecting status of Native Americans, implemented in 1953
Terminate with extreme prejudice, a euphemism for assassination
Abortion, as the termination of a pregnancy
"Termination", a song by Iron Butterfly on their 1968 album In-A-Gadda-Da-Vida
Cancellation (television), the termination of a television program
Termination of employment
Dismissal (employment), the termination of employment at a company

See also
 Extermination (disambiguation)
 Terminate (disambiguation)
 Terminator (disambiguation)
 Terminal (disambiguation)
 Terminus (disambiguation)